Gminny Ludowy Klub Sportowy Nadarzyn is a Polish football club located in Nadarzyn, Poland. It currently plays in Klasa A. The team's colors are yellow and blue.

Honours & Achievements

Domestic
 Polish Second League:
14 place (1): 2010/11

Current squad

 Current squad

External links
Official website
GLKS Nadarzyn at 90minut.pl

References

Football clubs in Poland
Association football clubs established in 1952
1952 establishments in Poland
Pruszków County
Football clubs in Masovian Voivodeship